Ngô Quyền is an urban district (quận) of Hai Phong, the third largest city of Vietnam. It is named after King Ngô Quyền who defeated the Chinese at the famous Battle of Bạch Đằng River north of modern Haiphong and ended 1,000 years of Chinese domination dating back to 111 BC under the Han Dynasty.

References

Districts of Haiphong